Denis Ramón Caniza Acuña (born 29 August 1974) is a Paraguayan former footballer who played as a defender.

Career
Born in Bella Vista, Amambay, Caniza started his career in Olimpia of Paraguay. He also played in Lanús of Argentina, Santos Laguna, Atlas, Cruz Azul, Leon, and Irapuato of Mexico.

Caniza was a regular in the Paraguay national football team because of his versatility, as he can play as a side defender or as a centre-back. After the 2006 FIFA World Cup, Caniza announced his retirement from the Paraguay national team. However, when coach Gerardo Martino took the helm of the national team Caniza was called back and accepted to return to play for Paraguay. After Gerardo Martino took the head coach job in the Paraguay national football team, Caniza was voted for his teammates to become the captain of the team, so every time he played (when he was not injured or suspended) he captained the Paraguay national football team.

Caniza holds the distinction as the only Paraguayan footballer to be selected for 4 consecutive FIFA World Cup Finals, having been chosen in 1998, 2002, 2006 and 2010.

Due to his small size and industrial play, he has been described by BBC South American reporter Tim Vickery as "the Paraguayan Nobby Stiles".

In December 2014, Caniza announced his retirement at the age of 40 and his intention to have wanted to retire at Olimpia Asunción.

Career statistics

International goals

Honours
Olimpia
Paraguayan Primera División (4): 1995, 1997, 1998, 1999

Santos Laguna
Mexican Primera División (1): 2001 Verano
InterLiga (1): 2004

Nacional
Paraguayan Primera División (1): 2009 Clausura

See also
 List of men's footballers with 100 or more international caps

References

External links
 International statistics at rsssf
 
 Denis Caniza at FootballDatabase.com 
 

1974 births
Living people
Association football defenders
Paraguayan footballers
Club Olimpia footballers
Club Nacional footballers
Club Atlético Lanús footballers
Club Rubio Ñu footballers
Santos Laguna footballers
Cruz Azul footballers
Atlas F.C. footballers
Club León footballers
Irapuato F.C. footballers
Sportivo Luqueño players
Paraguayan Primera División players
Argentine Primera División players
Liga MX players
Paraguay international footballers
Paraguayan expatriate footballers
Expatriate footballers in Argentina
Expatriate footballers in Mexico
1998 FIFA World Cup players
1999 Copa América players
2001 Copa América players
2002 FIFA World Cup players
2006 FIFA World Cup players
2010 FIFA World Cup players
FIFA Century Club